"Nina, Pretty Ballerina" is a song recorded in November 1972 by Swedish pop group ABBA, and released on 7" vinyl record in Austria and France in October 1973 as the seventh and final single from the band's debut album Ring Ring. It reached #8 on the singles chart in Austria.

The song was also the theme song of Sirius talk-show host Lynn Samuels. Lynn Samuels only played "Nina, Ballerina," as she called it, on Friday, to reward herself for working all week, when she was on Sirius Radio in New York.

Track listings
Austria
 A. "Nina, Pretty Ballerina"
 B. "I Am Just a Girl"

France
 A1. "Nina, Pretty Ballerina"
 A2. "He Is Your Brother"

Philippines
 A1. "Nina, Pretty Ballerina"
 A2. "So Long"

Kenya
 A. "Nina, Pretty Ballerina"
 B. "Dance (While the Music Still Goes On)"

Cover versions
 The song was covered by Hong Kong-born Filipino singer Rowena Cortes for her 1977 album Sweet Fairy.
 German girl group Pretty Maid Company released a cover of the song as a single in 1977.
 Jawadde, a group from Ghent - East Flanders, released Mina, schuune ballerina at the beginning of the preceding century's eighties.

Charts

References

1973 singles
ABBA songs
Songs written by Benny Andersson and Björn Ulvaeus
Polar Music singles
Songs about dancing
Songs about theatre
Songs about occupations
Songs about fictional female characters